FLOW is a Belgian national health care network, meant for health care providers and patients. It is an acronym which stands for Facilities (services and related infrastructure), Legal implementation (the telex files), Organisations (locoregional teams) and Wisdom (coordination and supervision center). The system is built around the principle of a shared health patient record.

Regions
 FLOW Alfa: Wallonia
 FLOW Beta: Brussels
 FLOW Gamma: Flanders

See also
 Belgian Health Telematics Commission (BHTC)
 BeHealth
 KMEHR
 SumEHR

Sources
 FLOW
 Note de Politique Generale (3 Dec. 2004)

Health informatics
Medical and health organisations based in Belgium

References